

People
 Khizar Khan Niazi, ancestor of all Khizarkhel clan of Pashtun tribe Niazi.
Khizar Hayat, Malaysian cricketer
Khizar Muazzam Khan, Pakistani-American lawyer
Sir Khizar Hayat Tiwana, Punjabi politician

Places
 Khwaja Khizr Tomb at Sonipat